Arkadiusz is a masculine Polish given name. Notable people with the name include:

Arkadiusz Aleksander (born 1980), Polish football player
Arkadiusz Bąk (born 1974), Polish footballer
Arkadiusz Baran (born 1979), Polish football player
Arkadiusz Bazak (born 1939), Polish actor
Arkadiusz Bilski (born 1973), Polish football player
Arkadiusz Czarnecki (born 1987), Polish footballer
Arkadiusz Czartoryski (born 1966), Polish politician
Arkadiusz Głowacki (born 1979), Polish footballer
Arkadiusz Godel (born 1952), Polish fencer
Arkadiusz Gołaś (1981–2005), Polish volleyball player
Arkadiusz Jakubik (born 1969), Polish actor
Arkadiusz Kaliszan (born 1972), retired Polish professional footballer
Arkadiusz Klimek (born 1975), Polish professional footballer
Arkadiusz Korobczynski, Polish Cold War pilot, defector to Sweden in 1949
Arkadiusz Kubik (born 1972), Polish footballer
Arkadiusz Litwiński (born 1970), Polish politician
Arkadiusz Malarz (born 1980), Polish goalkeeper
Arkadiusz Miklosik (born 1975), retired Polish footballer
Arkadiusz Milik (born 1994), Polish footballer
Arkadiusz Miłoszewski (born 1973), Polish basketball coach and former player
Arkadiusz Moryto (born 1997), Polish handball player
Arkadiusz Mularczyk (born 1971), Polish politician
Arkadiusz Mysona (born 1981), Polish football player
Arkadiusz Onyszko (born 1974), Polish goalkeeper
Arkadiusz Piech (born 1985), Polish footballer
Arkadiusz Radomski (born 1977), Polish footballer
Arkadiusz Rybicki (1953–2010), Polish politician
Arkadiusz Ryś (born 1988), Polish footballer
Arkadiusz Skrzypaszek (born 1968), Polish modern pentathlete
Arkadiusz Sojka (born 1980), former Polish footballer
Arkadiusz Woźniak (born 1990), Polish footballer

Polish masculine given names